Scott Lawrence Palk (born 1967) is an American attorney and academic. He is currently a Judge of the United States District Court for the Western District of Oklahoma. He formerly served as Assistant Dean at the University of Oklahoma College of Law.

Education and legal career
Palk is a 1985 graduate of Charles Page High School in Sand Springs, Oklahoma. He received a Bachelor of Science degree in 1989 from Oklahoma State University and a Juris Doctor in 1992 from the University of Oklahoma College of Law.

From 1992 to 2002, Palk served as an Assistant District Attorney for Cleveland County in Norman, Oklahoma, serving as First Assistant District Attorney from 1999 to 2002. From 2002 to 2011, he served as an Assistant United States Attorney in the Criminal Division of the United States Attorney's Office for the Western District of Oklahoma, holding a number of managerial roles beginning in 2004, including Deputy Criminal Chief and Anti-Terrorism Advisory Council Coordinator. Palk won Prosecutor of the Year awards in 1993 and 2004.

From 2011 until his confirmation as a U.S. District Judge, he served as the Assistant Dean for Students and Assistant General Counsel at the University of Oklahoma College of Law. In addition to overseeing admissions and providing legal counsel, he served as a consultant to the University's Threat Assessment Review Committee, advising in areas of criminal threat assessment and legal access.

Federal judicial service

Expired district court nomination under Obama 

On December 16, 2015, President Obama nominated Palk to serve as a United States District Judge of the United States District Court for the Western District of Oklahoma, to the seat vacated by Judge Stephen P. Friot, who assumed senior status on December 1, 2014. He received a hearing before the United States Senate Judiciary Committee on April 20, 2016. On May 19, 2016, his nomination was reported out of committee by a voice vote. His nomination expired on January 3, 2017, with the end of the 114th Congress.

Renomination to district court under Trump
On May 7, 2017, a White House official indicated that Palk would be renominated by President Donald Trump to the same seat. His renomination was announced on May 8, 2017. On June 15, 2017, his nomination was reported out of the United States Senate Judiciary Committee by a 17–3 vote. On October 25, 2017, the United States Senate invoked cloture on his nomination by a 79–18 vote. On October 26, 2017, Palk was confirmed by a 79–16 vote. He received his judicial commission on October 31, 2017.

Personal life
Palk was inducted into the Charles Page High School Hall of Fame in 2019.

See also 
 Barack Obama judicial appointment controversies

References

External links 
 
 Biography at Western District of Oklahoma
 

1967 births
Living people
20th-century American lawyers
21st-century American lawyers
21st-century American judges
Assistant United States Attorneys
Judges of the United States District Court for the Western District of Oklahoma
Deans of law schools in the United States
Lawyers from Tulsa, Oklahoma
Oklahoma lawyers
Oklahoma State University alumni
United States district court judges appointed by Donald Trump
University of Oklahoma College of Law alumni